James Bluford Price (September 17, 1940 – August 10, 2012) was a professional American football linebacker in the American Football League for the New York Jets and Denver Broncos. He was selected by the Dallas Cowboys in the 3rd round (34th overall) of the 1963 NFL Draft. He played college football at Auburn University.

Early years
Price attended Ysleta High School, where he was a two-way player. He accepted a football scholarship from Auburn University, where he was a three-year starter at center and linebacker.

As a sophomore, he was named the starter replacing graduated All-American Jackie Burkett, but suffered a dislocated right shoulder and missed 3 games, until returning to play against Georgia Tech. In 1962, he was named third-team All-SEC as a center.

Professional career

Dallas Cowboys
Price was selected by the Dallas Cowboys in the third round (34th overall) of the 1963 NFL Draft and by the New York Jets in the sixth round (43rd overall) of the 1963 AFL Draft.

He signed with the Cowboys, but his play during training camp was disappointing and was released before the season started in September.

New York Jets
On September 5, 1963, he signed as a free agent with the New York Jets (at the time the New York Titans) and became a starter. On January 1, 1964, he was part of the largest trade ever made in the American Football League, when he was sent along with Dick Guesman, Ed Cooke, Charlie Janerette and Sid Fournet, to the Denver Broncos, in exchange for Gene Prebola, Wahoo McDaniel, Gordy Holz and Bob Zeman.

Denver Broncos
In 1964, the Denver Broncos played him as a linebacker and offensive lineman. He suffered a knee injury in the fourth game against the Boston Patriots and was lost for the year.

References

1940 births
2012 deaths
Players of American football from El Paso, Texas
American football linebackers
Auburn Tigers football players
New York Jets players
Denver Broncos players
American Football League players
People from Nettleton, Mississippi